The Pogoro (also Pogolo) are an ethnic and linguistic peoples based in Iringa Region and Morogoro Region, Tanzania.

References

 Green, M. (2003). Priests, Witches and Power: Popular Christianity after Mission in Southern Tanzania. Cambridge: Cambridge University Press.

Ethnic groups in Tanzania
Kilombero languages
Languages of Tanzania
Non-tonal languages in tonal families